Rebuild is the third album by The Letter Black. The album was released on November 11, 2013

Overview 
In early 2013, the band was reported to be recording new material for their second studio album, later revealed to be called Rebuild. The first single for the new album, "Sick Charade", was released on October 3, 2012. "The Only One" was released in February 2013 and "Pain Killer" was released on September 10, 2013. The album was initially scheduled to be released on April 23, 2013, however, on April 17, the album was postponed because the band decided to write three new songs for the album  The album was released on November 11, 2013.

Critical reception

Track listing

Chart performance

References 

Albums produced by Johnny K
2013 albums
The Letter Black albums